Maria Jeżak-Athey  is a Polish figure skating coach. She is a former Polish national champion in pair skating with Lech Matuszewski. She currently coaches at the Addison Ice Arena in Chicago, Illinois. She coached 2010 Olympic champion Evan Lysacek and 2022 World Champion pairs skater Alexa Scimeca Knierim.

Results
(with Matuszewski)

External links
 International Skating Corporation

Polish female pair skaters
Polish figure skating coaches
Living people
Sportspeople from Warsaw
Female sports coaches
1963 births